Julien Jérôme Ebah Tobie (born 27 September 1990) is a Cameroonian professional footballer who plays as a striker .

Career
In 2015 season Ebah became Top scorer of Cameroonian Premier League with 16 goals. In September 2015, Ebah signed for Azerbaijan Premier League side Kapaz PFK. His first goal against Ravan FC in October 2015 was selected as Azerbaijan Premier League best goal of the first half of the season 2015/2016. He scored another fantastic goal for Kapaz PFC against Azal FC  on 7 February 2016. Ebah left Kapaz on 26 May 2017.

Career statistics

Club

International

Statistics accurate as of match played 30 August 2013

References

External links
 
 

1990 births
Living people
Cameroonian footballers
Cameroonian expatriate footballers
Footballers from Yaoundé
Liga I players
Azerbaijan Premier League players
Qatar Stars League players
Saudi First Division League players
Kapaz PFK players
Al-Khor SC players
Al-Shoulla FC players
Association football forwards
New Star de Douala players
Les Astres players
Expatriate footballers in Azerbaijan
Expatriate footballers in Qatar
Cameroonian expatriate sportspeople in Qatar
Expatriate footballers in Saudi Arabia
Cameroonian expatriate sportspeople in Saudi Arabia
Cameroon international footballers
Cameroonian expatriate sportspeople in Azerbaijan